Timo Leino (May 16, 1936 – January 18, 2014) founded the Department of Speech Technique in the University of Tampere in 1974. He was the head of Department from 1974 to 2001. Leino pioneered speech analysis in Finland. He worked extensively as a versatile influencer who courageously and determinedly developed speech education in Finland.

Academic Theses 
(1976) Hyvän äänen spektripiirteitä (Spectral features of good human voice). University of Helsinki, Department of Phonetics, Logopedics, Finland, (Licentiate thesis) 

(1967) Rytmijaksoanalyysi Volter Kilven kertomuksesta Vierniemen Jooseppi (Rhythm analysis of Volter Kilpi's story Joseph of Vierniemi). University of Helsinki, Department of Phonetics, Finland, (Master's thesis)

Textbook

Publications

2010s 
 Leino, Timo & Laukkanen, Anne-Maria & Vojtech, Radolf:  Journal of Voice, March 2011;25:2:150–158. .

2000s 
  Journal of Voice, November 2009;23:6:671–676. .
  Folia Phoniatrica et Logopaedica, August 2008;60:199–209. .
  Logopedics Phoniatrics Vocology, 2004;29:2:66–76. .
 Waaramaa, Teija & Laukkanen, Anne-Maria & Leino, Timo: Student actors' expression of emotions on prolonged vowels. PEVOC 5, Graz 28–31 August 2003, Austria.
 Laukkanen, Anne-Maria & Syrjä, Tiina & Leino, Timo:  PEVOC 4, Stockholm 23–26 August 2001, Sweden.
 Leino, Timo & Laukkanen, Anne-Maria & Välikoski, Tuula-Riitta (eds.):  (Three decades of speech technique and vocology at the University of Tampere). Vokologiaa, puheviestintää ja muuta puheentutkimusta – Juhlakirja Timo Leinolle (Vocology, Speech Communication and Other Speech Research – Anniversary Book for Timo Leino). Department of Speech Technique, University of Tampere, Finland, 125 pages. 2001. .

1990s 
 Leino, Timo:  (Measurement of pitch and evaluation of the need for change). Äänen tutkiminen ja äänihäiriöiden ennaltaehkäisy. (Jaana Sellman, Anna-Maija Korpijaakko-Huuhka, T. Siirilä, eds.) Publications of the Finnish Logopedic-Phonetic Association 31, 1999: 41–49.
 Leino, Timo:  Proceedings of the 24th World Congress of the International Association of Logopedics and Phoniatrics – Communication and its disorders a science in progress. IALP August 23–27, 1998, Amsterdam, Nijmegen University Press. The Netherlands. Pages 56–59. .
 Leino, Timo & Laukkanen, Anne-Maria & Kättö, Riitta & Ilomäki, Irma:  Proceedings of the 24th World Congress of the International Association of Logopedics and Phoniatrics – Communication and its disorders a science in progress. IALP August 23–27, 1998, Amsterdam, Nijmegen University Press. The Netherlands. Pages 60–62. .
 Leino Timo:  In: Friberg A, Iwarsson J, Jansson E, Sundberg J, editors. Proceedings of the Stockholm Music Acoustics Conference (SMAC 93). Stockholm: Royal Swedish Academy of Music. 1994;79:206–210.
 Leino, Timo & Laukkanen, Anne-Maria:  (Effect of recording distance on average speech spectrum). Fonetiikan päivät – Helsinki 1992, Papers from the 17th Meeting of Finnish Phoneticians, (Antti Iivonen, Reijo Aulanko, eds.) Publications of the Department of Phonetics, University of Helsinki, Finland, 36. pp. 117–130, 1993. .
 Leino, Timo:  (Average pitch). Fonetiikan päivät – Oulu 1990, Papers from the 16th Meeting of Finnish Phoneticians, (Kari Suomi, eds.), Publications of the Department of Speech Therapy and Phonetics, University of Oulu, Finland, 5, pp. 33–51, 1991.

1980s 
 Leino, Timo:  (Spectral observations of the overtone song and the simultaneous singing and whistling). Papers from the 14th Meeting of Finnish Phoneticians. Papers in Speech Research (Pertti Hurme, Hannele Dufva, eds.) University of Jyväskylä, Finland, pp. 159–178, 1987. .

1970s 
 Leino, Timo:  (Spectral features of good human voice). University of Helsinki, Department of Phonetics, Logopedics, Finland, 1976.
 Leino, Timo:  (Investigating Human Voice Quality with Real-Time Average Spectrum). Papers in Phonetics – Tampere 1974, Department of Speech Technique, University of Tampere, Finland, pp. 93–114, 1975.

1960s 
 Leino, Timo:  (Rhythm analysis of Volter Kilpi's story Joseph of Vierniemi). University of Helsinki, Department of Phonetics, Finland, 1967.

References 

1936 births
2014 deaths
Academic staff of the University of Tampere
Speech and language pathology